Laura Schwensen (born 25 July 1991) is a German rower. She competed in the women's eight event at the 2012 Summer Olympics.

She was part of the German women's eight that won bronze at the 2010 and 2014 European Championships.

References

External links
 

1991 births
Living people
German female rowers
Olympic rowers of Germany
Rowers at the 2012 Summer Olympics
Sportspeople from Schleswig-Holstein